El Toro (Spanish for "the Bull") is the nickname of:

Roberto Acuña (born 1972), Paraguayan footballer
Pedro Álvarez (baseball) (born 1987), third baseman with the Pittsburgh Pirates Major League Baseball team
Daniel Aquino (born 1965), retired Argentine footballer
Mauro Cantoro (born 1976), Argentine footballer
Alexander Lévy (born 1990), French golfer
Ernesto Pérez Balladares (born 1946), former President of Panama (1994-99)
Jaime Castillo Petruzzi, Chilean terrorist and financier
Lupillo Rivera (born 1972), Mexican-American singer
Fernando Valenzuela (born 1960), Mexican Major League Baseball pitcher
Carlos Zambrano (born 1981), Venezuelan Major League Baseball pitcher

See also
Bull (nickname)

Lists of people by nickname